The Shammar Mountains is a mountain range in the northwestern Saudi Arabian province of Ha'il. It includes the Ajā and Salma subranges.

Geology 

The Aja Mountains are to an extent made up of granite, whereas the Salma are made up of basalt. The phrase "Hadn formation" was used by Chevremont (1982) to refer to volcanic rocks of the area of Ha'il, and was treated by Hadley and Schmidt (1980) as being part of a silicic and volcaniclastic sequence referred to as the "Shammar group", in a broader, regional context.

Wildlife 
The protected area of Jabal Aja is of ecological significance. Two Asiatic cheetahs, the last known in the country, were killed near Ha'il in 1973, and their skins kept near the Imara Palace for a few days.

Peaks 
 Mount Aja
 Mount Samra'

Gallery

See also 

 Adayra Valley
 Emirate of Jabal Shammar
 Ghor es-Safi
 List of mountains in Saudi Arabia
 People:
 Al Fadl
 Jarrahids
 Shammar
 Tayy'

References

External links 
 The tantalizing Aja and Salma mountains in Hail, northwest of Saudi Arabia (Twitter)
 Mobily_Hail_Shamma & Salma Mountain_HD (Dailymotion)

Mountain ranges of Saudi Arabia